The Wascom House, at 303 E. Michigan Ave. in Hammond, Louisiana, was built around 1897.  It was listed on the National Register of Historic Places in 2008. It has also been known as Kemp House.

It was constructed by a builder named Clavert, in a vernacular version of Stick/eastlake architecture, with some Italianate influence.

The house was repaired after some damage in Hurricane Katrina.

References

National Register of Historic Places in Tangipahoa Parish, Louisiana
Stick-Eastlake architecture
Buildings and structures completed in 1897